The Center of Excellence (CoE) in Nanotechnology is located on the Asian Institute of Technology campus. It is one of the eight centers of excellence in Thailand.

The CoEN at AIT is about applied research and graduate education in nanotechnology. The unifying concept in the center's research activities is to use inexpensive wet-chemical methods to fabricate innovative materials and futuristic device components. Current research activities at the CoEN focus on dye-sensitized solar cells, piezotronic devices, gas sensors, bio-diagnostic tools, specific microbial sensors, heavy metal ion sensors for wastewater, environmental mitigation through visible light photocatalysis, the shake-up of nanoparticles, and layer-by-layer growth from colloidal particles, among others. The Master's degree program launched Nanotechnology in 2009. The center has over 30 members from 10 countries carrying out cross-disciplinary research in nanotechnology.

Notable international collaborations are with: the State University of New York, Buffalo, USA; S N Bose National Centre for Basic Science, India; Center of Photoelectrochemical Energy, Korea University, Jochiwon, South Korea; Center for Nanobioscience, Agharkar Institute, India; Inorganic Materials Laboratory, Royal Institute of Technology, Stockholm, Sweden; Swiss Federal Institute of Technology, Switzerland; Uppsala University, Sweden; University of Quebec, Canada; Leibniz Institute of New Materials, Germany; University of California, Berkeley, USA; and Griffith University, Australia.

History

The Center of Excellence in Nanotechnology was launched in 2006 to address the shortage of research facilities in Thailand. Activities include joint research with local and international universities and institutes, education and training personnel in the field of nanotechnology, technology transfer, and promotion of public and industrial awareness of nanotechnology. This center provides an international platform for academics and researchers from Thailand, AIT, and industry.

In Thailand, there are currently 8 Centers of Excellence under the Thailand National Nanotechnology Center: NANOTEC: Kasetsert University, Bangkok; Chulalongkorn University, Bangkok; King Mongkut Institute of Technology, Ladkrabang, Bangkok; Mahidol University, Bangkok; Asian Institute of Technology, Pathum Thani; Prince of Songkhla University, Phuket; Khon Kaen University, Khon Kaen; and Chiang Mai University, Chiang Mai.

The Center of Excellence in Nanotechnology at AIT was set up jointly with the National Nanotechnology Center, Thailand, of the NSTDA, at the Asian Institute of Technology campus in Thailand. Under the agreement, AIT and NANOTEC support the center jointly. A few faculties at AIT joined hands to propose that this center be established in the institute. The faculties came from all three schools, and the founding members were: Prof. Joydeep Dutta, Prof. W. Kanok-Nukulchai, Dr. Oleg Shipin, the late Dr. N. Coowanitwong, Dr. M. Parnichkun, Dr. Mousa M. Nazhad, Dr. S. Venkatesh and Dr. P. Herabat. A few rooms in the Chalarm Prakiat Building at the Asian Institute of Technology were allocated for its operation. Initially, due to a lack of sufficient funds, the center had a hard time starting operations. Prof. Joydeep Dutta, CoEN Director, recalls, "I used to get glasses and mugs from my house to fulfill the students requirements for glasswares in the lab." Over the years, the center got crowded with new equipment coming in and more researchers joining the nanoteam. Eventually, on September 2009, the center was officially shifted to the Outreach building.

On September 8, 2009, a state-of-the-art facility of the Center of Excellence in Nanotechnology at AIT was jointly inaugurated by Prof. Said Irandoust, AIT President, and Dr. Paritud Bhandhubanyong, Director, National Metal and Materials Technology Center. The lab had a bigger and larger space and was more open to visitors from outside.

Administration

The Asian Institute of Technology governs the administrative activities of the Center of Excellence in Nanotechnology. Prof. Joydeep Dutta, is the director of CoEN.

Campus
The facilities provided for students in AIT are shared with the researchers of the center. These include sporting facilities such as football grounds, tennis fields, badminton, volleyball, basketball courts, a swimming pool, and a golf course. A two-story library is accessible to all the members of AIT.

Academics

Doctoral research in nanotechnology has been taking place since 2003. But, a Master's degree program in Nanotechnology at AIT was recently launched in August 2009. It has attracted considerable interest amongs students across Asia. The program is open to graduates with a Bachelor of engineering (electrical, chemical, mechanical, industrial, telecommunications, computer engineering, electronics, and instrumentation) as well as a Bachelor of Science (physics and chemistry).

Essential features of AIT's Nanotechnology degree program are: programmatic balance; processing nanostructure properties and applications (P-N-P-A); interdisciplinarity; science (including biology); and technology; integrated classroom-lab experience; hands-on experiments and use of instrumentation; curriculum-linked to applications; balance between theory and practice (industrial needs); and content addressing societal impact: public safety, ethics, and awareness.

Courses offered
The aim of the "integrated Master's degree programme in Nanotechnology" is to address the knowledge-based industries of the 21st century, which will require the continuous development of their workforce in this new field as well as a technically updated management. The Nanotechnology course is designed in such a way that students from different disciplines can get easily acquainted with the subject matter. Prof. Dutta, Director, CoeN at AIT, and Prof. G. Louis Hornyak, visiting faculty, are teaching students from different backgrounds, such as material sciences, chemistry, physics, agriculture, etc. The Nanotechnology Master's Degree Program is designed to be multidisciplinary, covering areas such as:
The macroscopic and microscopic world
Physics/electronics
Chemistry/chemical engg.
Biotechnology
Material sciences
Microsystem technology
Instrumentation
Environment

The list of the courses offered under School or an institute-level course: School of engineering and Technology and Area/Field of Study: Nanotechnology on the AIT website is given below.

Self-assembly and molecular manufacturing (January)
Impact of Nanotechnology on Society (August)
Intellectual Property Rights for Technology Development and Management (August)
Solid State Physics for Nanotechnology (January)
Fundamentals of Chemistry (August)
Catalysis (August)
Nano Thermodynamics (January)
Nanomaterials and Nanotechnology (January)
Colloids and Nanoparticles (August)
Microelectronics Fabrication Technology (August)
Microelectromechanical and nanoelectromechanical systems (January)
Characterization Tools in Nanotechnology (January)
Advanced Seminars in Nanotechnology (January)

Research

The Center of Excellence in Nanotechnology has acquired synthesis experience with nanoparticles through reactive precipitation techniques. Gold, silver, platinum, palladium, zinc sulfide, zinc oxide, and silica nanoparticles are synthesized regularly at the center for a variety of applications. The platform technology of the center can be discussed as follows:

Nanoparticles: gold, silver, platinum, palladium, silica, zinc oxide, and zinc sulfide
Nanowires: zinc oxide
Coating Techniques: sol-gel coating, pyrosol coating, layer-by-layer organization, inkjet printing, spin coating

The research efforts in the AIT center are broadly classified into three groups:

Environment: photocatalysis, heavy metal ion sensors, bacteria sensing, self-cleaning windows
Agriculture and Food: E. coli sensors, E. nose, smart pesticides, gas sensors
Alternate Energy Harvesting: nano-bio solar cells, nano-energy generators

The primary objective of the center is to seek applications for nanoparticles. Research work has extended to nanowires, and extensive work is being carried out, especially in the environmental application and the energy harvesting side of the application of nanowires on zinc oxide. The competence achieved at the CoEN in AIT has been primarily in the synthesis of metal nanoparticles like gold, silver, platinum, and palladium, and zinc compounds, namely zinc oxide and zinc sulfide. Some additional work on the development of sol-gel titanium dioxide has also taken place. Doping of semiconductor nanoparticles and studies on the defect engineering of metal oxides have been another key area of research at the center, with an objective to apply the added value obtained from defect engineering to some applications.

Synthesis of nanoparticles

The different methods employed to synthesize nanoparticles of gold, silver, zinc sulfide, zinc oxide, and silica, among others, are briefly given below:

Gold Nanoparticles

Generally, gold nanoparticles in aqueous solutions are synthesized by the reduction of hydrogen tetrachloroaurate (HAuCl4). To prevent the particles so formed from aggregating, often stabilizing agents are added. During the process, tri-sodium citrate reduces the gold salt to metallic gold particles, which act as seeds for continuous growth.

Silver Nanoparticles

The silver nanoparticles are synthesized by chemical reduction of silver nitrate. The reducing reagent used for the synthesis of silver nanoparticles is similar to the Turkevitch method, i.e., using tri-sodium citrate. After the creation of the nanoparticle colloids, in order to increase the viscosity for jetting the inks, polymers such as chitosan, polyvinyl alcohol (PVA), and polyethylene glycol (PEG) are added to stabilize the solution.

ZnS Nanoparticles

The organometallic synthesis of ZnS:Mn2+ nanoparticles developed is similar to the method described by Bhargava et al.

ZnO Nanoparticles
ZnO nanoparticles are synthesized in three different solvents, and their optical absorptions are studied to determine in which solvent the nanoparticles absorb maximum visible light in the optical band ranging between 400 nm and 700 nm. The nanoparticles synthesized in different solvents (isopropanol, methanol, and ethanol) by the standard methods as explained in the experimental section yielded nanoparticles that are almost comparable in size (5 to 7 nm).

Silica Nanoparticles
Silica nanoparticles can be synthesized by the sol-gel method; Stöber et al. published a process for synthesising silica particles by hydrolysis of tetraethyl orthosilicate (TEOS) in an ethanol solution, which is catalyzed by ammonia (NH3). Monodispersed silica spheres can be obtained from the hydrolysis and condensation of alkoxide silicon by the following methods:

Hydrolysis: to form silanol groups

Condensation : to form siloxane bridges

ZnO can be synthesized into various novel structures due to the loose packing of tetrahedral structures and the different ionic radii of Zn2+ (74 picometers) and O2− (140 picometers). This causes large open spaces inside the hexagonal ZnO structure and makes it possible to control the shape of nanostructured particles. The growth of ZnO structures depends on various conditions, for example, the pH of the solvent, temperature, duration of growth, and nature of the solvent.

Besides the concentration effect on particle size, it can also affect particle shape. A study by Masuda et al., synthesizing ZnO nanoparticles from zinc acetate [Zn(CH3COO)2] and ammonia precursors, shows that the morphology of ZnO crystals is controlled by the ratio of ammonia to zinc acetate, NH3:Zn. This alters the supersaturation point of crystallization. The reaction is demonstrated in Figure.

Zinc acetate [Zn(CH3COO)2] solution is prepared in ethanol under vigorous stirring until zinc acetate is dissolved in ethanol at a temperature of around 50 °C. Then ethanol is added and continuously stirred at a temperature of around 80 °C for half an hour. After that, the solution is cooled to room temperature. NaOH in ethanol solution is prepared by vigorous stirring at 50 °C and then added to prepared zinc acetate in ethanol at room temperature. After that, ZnO seeds are put in hexamethylenetetramine (HMT) solution, commonly called hexamine, for the growth process. Hexamine is a water-soluble chemical, and the growth process can be done in the temperature range of 55–95 °C. After ZnO nanoparticles are grown to the desired shape, the particles will be coated with silica particles using the Stoeber method. The process is carried out in an ammonia-catalyzed reaction of TEOS in an ethanol-water solution. Polyvinylpyrrolidone (PVP) can be added optionally for stabilization purposes. A hydrolysis reaction is initiated to form silica nanoparticles coated on ZnO nanoparticles.

ZnO Nanorods
The center has been studying the hydrothermal growth process of ZnO nanorods for the last few years. A typical process was carried out in a sealed chemical bath containing an equimolar solution of zinc nitrate hexahydrate and hexamethylene tetramine at a temperature of 95 °C for a period of up to 20 hours. The thickness and length of the nanowires can be controlled by using different concentrations of the starting reactants and growth durations. A 0.5 mM chemical bath yielded nanowires with an average diameter of around 50 nm, while a 25 mM bath resulted in wires with a thickness of up to about 1μm. The length of the wires depends both on the concentration of the precursor solution as well as the growth duration, and in 20 hours, nanowires as long as 10 μm can be grown.

This center has considerable experience in the fabrication of ZnO nanorods, nanowires, and nanotubes. ZnO nanoplates that are now being used for specific applications Over the last few years, have acquired considerable expertise in the control of the aspect ratio and spacing of ZnO nanorods. Recently, inkjet printing was used to make arrays of ZnO nanorods.5

News

August 2010

9 August 2010: National Science and Technology Fair 2010 (NSTF 2010):

The Center of Excellence in Nanotechnology at AIT got actively involved in designing and conceptualizing the Nanotechnology Pavilion at the 2010 National Science and Technology Fair, which is being held until August 22 at the Bangkok International Trade and Exhibition Center (BITEC), Bang Na, Bangkok.

With this year's slogan "Towards a better society with Science and Technology," the National Science and Technology Fair 2010 was formally inaugurated by Dr. Virachai Virameteekul, Minister of Science and Technology, Thailand, on August 7, 2010. The fair covered a total area of 42,000 square meters on the grounds of the Bangkok International Trade and Exhibition Center (BITEC), Bang Na, Bangkok. With 7 ministries, 11 private enterprises, 5 major science societies, and 30 agencies from different universities participating from Thailand and more than 10 agencies participating from overseas, it is the largest science and technology fair held in Thailand. Around a million visitors, consisting mainly of school and university students from different parts of the country, are expected to visit the fair by its final day on August 22, 2010.

The participants were categorized into nine exhibition and activity sections, namely the Royal Pavilion, Ministry Pavilion, International Pavilion, University Pavilion, Science Associations, Private Enterprises, Thematic Exhibition, Activity for Youth Zones, and Academic Conference/Seminar/Workshop.

The Center of Excellence in Nanotechnology at AIT (CoEN at AIT), in collaboration with the National Science Museum, Thailand, helped in conceptualizing and designing the Nanotechnology Pavilion set up under the section: Thematic Exhibition. The exhibits at the pavilion, many of which were provided by CoEN at AIT, were designed to introduce the students to a whole new world of nanotechnology through simple demonstrations and hands-on activities. Children were busy with activities, such as making their own C60 fullerene (Bucky Ball) model using magnetic legos, trying to understand how surface to volume ratio increases with size minimization using building blocks, playing with a model explaining nanostructures, etc. For the more mature audience, a variety of information in the form of videos explaining the concept of scale and demonstrating ZnO-based LPG gas sensors, etc. was provided at the Pavilion.

With the growing popularity of nanotechnology in Thailand and, in many ways, due to the active involvement of Prof. Joydeep Dutta, the Director of CoEN at AIT and the current Vice President for Academic Affairs at AIT, in promoting nanotechnology-based research in Thailand, it was no wonder to see students from various schools and colleges taking a keen interest in what many believe is the technology of the future.

Publications
Over the past 6 years, the members of the center have published quite a few research papers in different journals. There are a few books that were released in 2008 and 2009. A list of major publications from 2005 onward is given below.

Books
G. Louis Hornyak, Joydeep Dutta, Harry F. Tibbals and Anil K. Rao, 2008, Introduction to NanoScience, CRC Press of Taylor and Francis Group LLC
G. Louis Hornyak, Joydeep Dutta, John J. Moore and Harry F. Tibbals, 2009, Fundamentals of NanoTechnology, CRC Press of Taylor and Francis Group LLC
G. Louis Hornyak, Joydeep Dutta, John J. Moore and Harry F. Tibbals, 2009, Introduction to Nanoscience & Nanotechnology, CRC Press of Taylor and Francis Group LLC

Book Chapters

 Nanoparticle Applications for Environmental Control and Remediation, S. Baruah, Rungrot Kitsaboonloha, Myo Myint Zar and J. Dutta, Nanoparticles: Synthesis, Characterization and Applications Edited by R. S. Chaughule and R. V. Ramanujan, American Scientific Publishers, Valencia, California, USA, (2009), Chapter 12 (22 Pages), in Press
 Nanotechnology for Agriculture, Food Systems and the Environment, S. Baruah, S. L. Ranamukhaarachchi and J. Dutta, The Age of Nanotechnology (2009), ed. Nirmala Rao Khadpekar, The ICFAI University Press, Hyderabad, India, in press
 Nanomaterials for Energy Conversion Applications, V. Renugopalakrishnan, A. M. Kannan, S. Srinivasan, V. Thavasi, S. Ramakrishna, P. Li, A. Mershin, S. Filipek, A. Kumar, J. Dutta, A. Jaya, L. Munukutla, S. Velumani, and G. F. Audette, Nanomaterials for Energy Storage Applications, Ed. H. S. Nalwa, American Scientific Publishers, Stevens Ranch, CA, USA, Ch. 5, pages 155–178, 2008
 Pollution Treatment, Remediation, and Sensing, A. Sugunan and J. Dutta, Nanotechnology, Volume 2: Environmental Aspects (2008), Krug, Harald (ed.), Wiley-VCH, Weinheim, Germany- , pg. 125–146
 Nanotechnology for Agriculture and Food Systems- A view, H. Warad and J. Dutta, The Age of Nanotechnology (2007), page 206–220, ed. Nirmala Rao Khadpekar, The ICFAI University Press, Hyderabad, India

Recreation center – A Little Nano Band
With the initiatives of a visiting faculty member to CoEN, Prof. Gabor L. Hornyak, Vice President, NanoThread, Inc., a small band named A Little Nano Band was created. With the professor himself on bass or piano, Bo Tay on rhythm guitar, Tanujjal Bora on drums, Htet Kyaw on tambourine, and Ajaya Sapkota or Mayuree Jaisai on vocals, the band plays covers of songs from 1960s classics to present-day pop music. The cultural diversity of the institution enables the band to select songs from different languages and play them to a vast group of listeners.

References

External links
CoEN at AIT official website
New Nanolab AIT Youtube Video
AIT Nanotechnology Facebook group

Asian Institute of Technology
University departments in Thailand